Merther (meaning marter's church) is a small hamlet  east of Truro in Cornwall, England.  It lies on the eastern side of the Tresillian River in the civil parish of St Michael Penkevil. It was formerly the churchtown of the small parish of Merther, and also the site of a manor house and medieval chapel dedicated to St Cohan (also spelt Coan). The former parish church is now in ruins.

St Coan was a martyr; there were formerly at Merther a chapel and holy well dedicated to him. A new church was built at Tresillian Bridge in 1904 (the font, bells, statue of St Anthony and pulpit from Merther were moved to the new church). The church was abandoned in the mid-20th century.

Geography

It is  via the modern tarmac road to Tresillian Church (which replaced St Cohan's) and the A390 road, which connects Truro and St Austell. There is a shorter route to Tresillian Church, by foot via the farm at Treffry. The former churchtown now consists of Eglosmertha, School Cottage, Rectory Cottage, Penhale and a ruined church and churchyard.

Tresawsan is a hamlet in the former parish of Merther; the meaning of Tresawsan is "Englishmen's farm". The historian William Hals was born at Tresawsan.

History
Eglosmerther is a Grade II listed building on the site of a manor house, and the barton was held in 1311 by the Reskymers. It is now a farm, and the farmhouse including the courtyard wall, was a rebuild in 1806–8 of an earlier house.

East of the parish church, in a field called St Coan which is the site of St Cohan's Chapel and well. By 1480 Cohan was regarded as a martyr and patron-saint of Merther. He may have been killed near here during the invasion of Cornwall by King Athelstan although there is no evidence that he was buried locally. His chapel was destroyed in about 1750 and by 1860 the last stones removed. An effigy of St Anthony probably from the 15th-century was moved to Merther Church.

The ruin of St Cohan's church is grade II listed and was built of slatestone walls with granite dressing. Dating from the 13th-century onwards it has a nave, chancel, west tower, south aisle and south porch. Said to be neglected in 1970, the church is now roofless and overgrown with vegetation. Until 1866, Merther was a chapelry to Probus,  to the north-east; it then became a civil parish. The ecclesiastical parish was combined with Lamorran in 1900 to form the parish of Lamorran and Merther, and the civil parish was abolished in 1934 and absorbed into the civil parish of St Michael Penkevil. In 1904 a more conveniently positioned church, at Tresillian Bridge was enlarged. The 12th-century Pentewan stone font, 17th-century polygonal oak pulpit and bells were removed to the new church, and St Cohan's became a mortuary chapel.

References

External links

 Merther, Cornwall. UK Genealogy Archive

Former civil parishes in Cornwall
Hamlets in Cornwall
Manors in Cornwall